Francis Joseph Beaty (May 23, 1919 – November 26, 1985) was an American professional basketball player. He played for the Rochester Royals in the National Basketball League for six games during the 1946–47 season and averaged 0.2 points per game.

References

External links
RIT Hall of Fame profile
Basketball-reference NBL stats
ESPN.com Stats

1919 births
1985 deaths
United States Navy personnel of World War II
American men's basketball players
Basketball players from New York (state)
Forwards (basketball)
People from Greece, New York
RIT Tigers men's basketball players
Rochester Royals players